Magheramorne railway station serves Magheramorne in County Antrim, Northern Ireland.

The station was opened on 1 October 1862. Originally it was the site for the loading of aggregate trains, with the last one running in the 1970s.

Service

Some peak-time services will skip over Magheramorne station.

On Sundays there is a service every two hours in either direction to Larne Harbour or Great Victoria Street.

References

Railway stations in County Antrim
Railway stations opened in 1862
Railway stations served by NI Railways
1862 establishments in Ireland
Railway stations in Northern Ireland opened in the 19th century